Armenia and Kazakhstan established diplomatic relations on August 27, 1992. Armenia has maintained an embassy in Astana and Kazakhstan has an embassy in Yerevan. Both countries are full members of the Eurasian Union, the Collective Security Treaty Organisation, of the Organization for Security and Co-operation in Europe and of the Commonwealth of Independent States. There are 25,000 people of Armenian descent living in Kazakhstan. Throughout the history, Kazakhstan, alongside Uzbekistan, are few Turkic countries that accept their Armenian population.

History 
Before 1918, both countries were part of the Russian Empire, and until 1991, they were both part of the USSR. Diplomatic relations were established between both countries on August 27, 1992. In 1991-1992, Kazakhstan took part in the settlement of the First Nagorno-Karabakh War. Since June 1993, the Armenian Embassy was opened in Kazakhstan. The Embassy of the Republic of Kazakhstan in Armenia has been operating since March 2007.

Friction in relations 
In 2014, Kazakhstan pushed back against the accession of Nagorno-Karabakh as part of Armenia to the Eurasian Economic Union, with President Nursultan Nazarbayev claiming that states could only join via UN-recognized borders, which angered the leadership of the Republic of Artsakh as well as the Armenian population, 64% of which at the time were for joining the EEU on the condition that it would be with Nagorno-Karabakh. During the April War, Kazakhstan voiced complaints over Armenian tactics, going as far as to recommend that the April EEU summit be relocated to Moscow from Yerevan. In a phone call with Kazakh Prime Minister Karim Masimov, who was due to be in Yerevan for the summit, Armenian Prime Minister Hovik Abrahamian rejected the proposal and warned that he may boycott the Moscow summit. A business delegation from Kazakhstan did not participate in “Invest Armenia - 2016" forum in Yerevan as planned, which caused the chairman of the Union of Manufacturers and Businessmen of Armenia to describe Kazakhstan as a "totalitarian country" where "the first words of command from above are enough for them to refuse the invitation." The Armenian village of Harich removed President Nazarbayev’s name a street named in his honor, with the mayor saying that Nazarbayev was supposed to be our friend, but he is now saying that ‘the Armenians are killing our brothers.’… So if the Azerbaijanis are their brothers then the Armenians must be their enemies."

Bilateral visits

 Between September 1 and September 2, 1999, Armenian president Robert Kocharyan made an official visit to Kazakhstan. He also paid an official visit in November 2006. President Serzh Sargsyan visited Kazakhstan in July and December 2008, October and December 2009, July 2010, April 2012, and May 2014.
In May 2001, Kazakh president Nursultan Nazarbayev made an official visit to Armenia.

Ambassadors

Kazakhstan to Armenia 
 Aiymdos Bozzhigitov (2010-2015)
 Timur Urazaev (22 April 2016 – 14 January 2021)

Armenia to Kazakhstan 
 Arman Melikyan (1993-1999)
 Eduard Khurshudyan (1999-2004)
 Levon Khachatryan (2005-2008)
 Vasiliy Gazaryan (2008-2013)
 Ara Sahakyan (2013-2018)
 Gagik Galachyan (2018-2020)

See also
 Foreign relations of Armenia
 Foreign relations of Kazakhstan
 Armenians in Kazakhstan

Further reading
 Armenian Ministry of Foreign Affairs about relations with Kazakhstan

References

 
Kazakhstan
Bilateral relations of Kazakhstan